"Little" Jack Lawrence (born December 18, 1976) is an American musician from Covington, Kentucky, currently living in Nashville, Tennessee.

Career 
Lawrence currently plays bass guitar in The Raconteurs, The Greenhornes, The Dead Weather and City and Colour as well as the autoharp and banjo in Blanche. He also guested on the theme song to the 2008 Bond film Quantum of Solace entitled "Another Way To Die", playing bass guitar and baritone guitar. On May 22, 2009, Lawrence married photographer Jo McCaughey at Jack White's house in Nashville in a double ceremony with Meg White and Jackson Smith. Lawrence contributed to the soundtrack of the 2009 Spike Jonze film Where the Wild Things Are.  He is uncredited but is one of the members of Karen O's backup band for the album, Karen O and the Kids. He is also credited on four songs from Wanda Jackson's album, The Party Ain't Over, which Jack White produced. He also plays bass on one track on White's album Blunderbuss and one track on Glim Spanky's album Looking for the Magic.

Discography 
1999 The Greenhornes - Gun for You
2001 The Greenhornes - The Greenhornes
2002 The Greenhornes - Dual Mono
2004 Loretta Lynn - Van Lear Rose
2004 Blanche - America's Newest Hitmakers
2005 The Greenhornes - East Grand Blues EP
2005 The Greenhornes - Sewed Soles
2006 The Raconteurs - Broken Boy Soldiers
2007 Blanche - Little Amber Bottles
2008 The Raconteurs - Consolers of the Lonely
2009 The Dead Weather - Horehound
2009 Karen O & The Kids - Where the Wild Things Are
2010 The Dead Weather - Sea of Cowards
2010 The Greenhornes -  ★★★★
2010 Karen Elson - "The Ghost Who Walks"
2012 Jack White - "Blunderbuss"
2013 City and Colour - "The Hurry and the Harm"
2014 Karen O - "Crush Songs"
2015 JEFF the Brotherhood - "Wasted on the Dream"
2015 The Dead Weather - "Dodge and Burn"
2015 City and Colour - "If I Should Go Before You"
2015 JEFF the Brotherhood - Global Chakra Rhythms
2017 Foshee - Strange Relations
2018 Glim Spanky - "TV Show"
2019 The Raconteurs - Help Us Stranger
2019 City and Colour - "A Pill For Loneliness"

Equipment

Pedals
The Dead Weather
Electro-Harmonix Bass Micro Synth - (An old one and a reissue)
Fulltone Bass Drive

References

External links 
theraconteurs.com - official The Raconteurs site
thedeadweather.com - official The Dead Weather site
greenhornes.com  - official The Greenhornes site
blanchemusic.com - official Blanche site

American banjoists
American rock bass guitarists
American rock singers
American autoharp players
Living people
Rock musicians from Kentucky
People from Covington, Kentucky
Place of birth missing (living people)
1976 births
Songwriters from Kentucky
Singers from Kentucky
Guitarists from Kentucky
American male bass guitarists
21st-century American male singers
21st-century American singers
21st-century American bass guitarists
The Dead Weather members
The Raconteurs members
The Greenhornes members
American male songwriters